El Sinai is a locality in San José del Palmar Municipality, Chocó Department in Colombia.

Climate
El Sinai has a subtropical highland climate (Köppen Cfb) with very heavy rainfall, warm afternoons and pleasant mornings year-round.

References

Populated places in the Chocó Department